Pasakhor (also Romanized as Pasākhor, Pas Ākhowr, and Pas Ākhvor) is a village in Qilab Rural District, Alvar-e Garmsiri District, Andimeshk County, Khuzestan Province, Iran. At the 2006 census, its population was 71, in 14 families.

References 

Populated places in Andimeshk County